The Greater Middle East, is a political term, introduced in March 2004 in a paper by the Carnegie Endowment for International Peace as a part of the U.S. administration's preparatory work for the Group of Eight summit of June 2004, denoting a vaguely defined region called the "Arab world" together with Afghanistan, Iran, Israel, Turkey, and several other neighbouring countries that have cultural ties. The paper presented a proposal for sweeping change in the way the West deals with the Middle East and North Africa. Previously, by Adam Garfinkle of the Foreign Policy Research Institute, the Greater Middle East had been defined as the MENA region together with Central Asia and the Caucasus.

The future of this Greater Middle East has sometimes been referred to as the "new Middle East", first so by U.S. Secretary of State Condoleezza Rice, who in Dubai in June 2006 presented the second-term Bush administration's vision for the region's future. Rice said would be achieved through 'constructive chaos', a phrase she repeated a few weeks later during a joint press conference with Israeli Prime Minister Ehud Olmert when the 2006 Lebanon War had broken out; the meaning of this phrase and the Bush administration's vision have been much debated since. The efforts to achieve this new Middle East are sometimes called "The Great Middle East Project".

Former U.S. National Security Advisor Zbigniew Brzezinski stated that a "political awakening" is taking place in this region which may be an indicator of the multipolar world that is now developing. He alluded to the Greater Middle East as the "Global Balkans", and as a control lever on an area he refers to as Eurasia. According to Andrew Bacevich's book America's War for the Greater Middle East (2016), this region is the theater for a series of conflicts dating back to 1980, which heralded the start of the Iran–Iraq War. Since then, the U.S. has been involved in balancing conflicts amongst these culturally interconnected nations in order to further its interests in the region.

See also
 Arab world
 Demographics of the Middle East and North Africa
 Great Game
 MENA (Middle East and North Africa)
 Muslim world
 Project for the New American Century 
 Sykes–Picot Agreement
 The Grand Chessboard

References

External links

 "Greater Middle East: The US plan"
 "The Greater Middle East Initiative: Sea Island and Beyond (U.S. Senate)"
 "Blood Borders: How a better Middle East would look"
 A legacy of U.S. military failure in the Middle East over the past three decades"

2004 neologisms
Political theories
Middle East
Geographical neologisms
Regions of Africa
Regions of Eurasia